Benjamin Orr (December 1, 1772 – September 3, 1828) was a member of the United States House of Representatives from Massachusetts.

Orr was born in Bedford in the Province of New Hampshire on December 1, 1772. He was self-educated and apprenticed as a carpenter.  He attended Fryeburg Academy, taught school at Concord and New Milford, New Hampshire; and graduated from Dartmouth College in 1798.  He studied law, was admitted to the bar in 1801 and commenced the practice of law in Brunswick in Massachusetts' District of Maine.

Orr moved to Topsham, in 1801 and continued the practice of law; was overseer of Bowdoin College in Brunswick, and served as trustee from 1814 to 1828 and as treasurer in 1815 and 1816.

Orr was elected as a Federalist to the Fifteenth Congress (March 4, 1817 – March 3, 1819) but was not a candidate for renomination in 1818.

He resumed the practice of law in Topsham and, in 1822, returned to Brunswick to continue the practice of law.

He died in Brunswick, Maine on September 3, 1828, and he was interred in Pine Grove Cemetery.

Notes

Sources
 

1772 births
1828 deaths
Members of the United States House of Representatives from the District of Maine
Politicians from Brunswick, Maine
People from Bedford, New Hampshire
Dartmouth College alumni
Massachusetts Federalists
People from Topsham, Maine
Members of the United States House of Representatives from Massachusetts